Etchemin may refer to:

 Etchemin language, a language of the Algonquian language family, spoken in early colonial times on the coast of Maine
 Etchemin River, a river in the Chaudière-Appalaches region of eastern Quebec

See also
 Beauce-Etchemin School Board, headquartered in Saint-Georges, Quebec
 Bellechasse—Etchemins—Montmagny—L'Islet, a former federal electoral district in Quebec (1997-2004)
 Bellechasse—Les Etchemins—Lévis, a federal electoral district in Quebec (from 2004)
 École secondaire les Etchemins, a school in Charny, Quebec
 Lac-Etchemin, Quebec, a municipality in and the seat of Les Etchemins Regional County Municipality
 Lac Etchemin Airport
 Les Etchemins Regional County Municipality, Quebec